The Perry-Cooper House is a historic home located at Salisbury, Wicomico County, Maryland, United States. It is a three-story frame dwelling topped with a French mansard roof that was built about 1880. It features a central tower, with a bowed entrance on the first floor and a nine-foot-high Palladian window on the second. It was the residence of one of Salisbury's well-known civic leaders, Thomas Perry, whose family occupied the house from 1897 until 1950.

The Perry-Cooper House was listed on the National Register of Historic Places in 1977.

References

External links
, including undated photo, at Maryland Historical Trust

Houses on the National Register of Historic Places in Maryland
Houses in Wicomico County, Maryland
Second Empire architecture in Maryland
Houses completed in 1880
Buildings and structures in Salisbury, Maryland
National Register of Historic Places in Wicomico County, Maryland